Ginza Six is a luxury shopping complex located in the Ginza area of Tokyo, jointly developed by Mori Building Company, J. Front Retailing, Sumitomo Corporation and L Catterton Real Estate. The name Ginza Six or G Six reflects the building address in Ginza 6-chome as well as the desire to provide an exceptional "six-star" shopping experience.

History 
Ginza Six was built on the location of the former Matsuzakaya department store, which was Ginza's first ever department store. The complex was inaugurated on 17 April, 2017, in a ceremony attended by Prime Minister of Japan Shinzo Abe, Governor of Tokyo Yuriko Koike, Chairman of LVMH Bernard Arnault, and President of J. Front Retailing Ryoichi Yamamoto, among others. It is the largest retail space in Ginza.

Architecture 
The building has space for up to 241 stores, including flagship facilities for Fendi, Kenzo, Vivienne Westwood, Alexander McQueen, Yves Saint Laurent and Van Cleef & Arpels. It also contains six floors of office space (floors 7—12), 24 restaurants and cafes, a banquet hall, a 480-seater Noh theater and a 4,000 square-meter rooftop garden. A terminal for tourist buses, a tourist information center, currency exchanges and duty exemption services cater to tourists.

Ginza Six has an art program run by Fumio Nanjo of the Mori Art Museum. The complex focuses on contemporary Japanese art, in an attempt to "sp[eak] to the creativity associated with modern-day Japan rather than the traditional Japanese aesthetic." The Central atrium artworks are a symbol of GINZA SIX and the inaugural exhibits included works by Yayoi Kusama and Patrick Blanc, among others.

References

External links 
 
 

2017 establishments in Japan
Buildings and structures in Chūō, Tokyo
Ginza
J. Front Retailing
Shopping malls established in 2017
Shopping centres in Japan